La Historia Continúa... Parte III (Eng.: The History Continues... Vol. 3) is a compilation album released by Marco Antonio Solís on February 27, 2007. This album became his seventh number-one set on the Billboard Top Latin Albums. The album was released in a standard CD presentation and in a CD/DVD combo including the music videos for the singles "Sin Lado Izquierdo", "Mi Mayor Necesidad", "Tu Amor o Tu Desprecio" and "Casas de Cartón".

Track listing

All songs written and composed by Marco Antonio Solís except for Casas de Carton

DVD

Chart performance

Year-End Charts

Sales and certifications

References

2007 greatest hits albums
2007 video albums
Music video compilation albums
Marco Antonio Solís video albums
Marco Antonio Solís compilation albums
Fonovisa Records compilation albums